Leptospermum incanum is a species of compact shrub that is endemic to Western Australia. It has hairy young stems, elongated egg-shaped leaves on a short petiole, relatively large white or pink flowers and fruit that fall from the plant when mature.

Description

Taxonomy and naming
Leptospermum incanum was first formally described in 1852 by Nikolai Turczaninow in the Bulletin de la Classe Physico-Mathématique de l'Académie Impériale des Sciences de Saint-Pétersbourg from material collected by James Drummond. The specific epithet (incanum) is a Latin word meaning hoary.

Distribution and habitat
This tea-tree is found among granite outcrops between Coolgardie and the south coast of Western Australia where it grows in sandy soils in the Avon Wheatbelt, Coolgardie, Esperance Plains and Mallee biogeographic regions.

Conservation status
Leptospermum incanum is classified as "not threatened" by the Western Australian Government Department of Parks and Wildlife.

References

incanum
Endemic flora of Western Australia
Plants described in 1852
Taxa named by Nikolai Turczaninow